High Point University (HPU) is a private university in High Point, North Carolina. It is affiliated with the United Methodist Church. The university was founded as High Point College in 1924, and it became High Point University in October 1991. HPU offers 63 undergraduate majors, 65 undergraduate minors, and 18 graduate majors.

History 

In the mid-19th century, the Methodist Protestant Church, which is now part of the United Methodist Church, became active in educational pursuits in North Carolina. In 1921, after some years of consideration, the statewide governing body of the Methodist Protestant Church voted to establish a college. Shortly afterward, the church accepted an offer from the citizens of High Point to contribute  of land and $100,000 to the project, placing the new school in the city of High Point. The campus was designed by R. E. Mitchell of Washington, D.C., assisted by Herbert Hunter of High Point, in the English Renaissance style. The school was founded in 1924 as High Point College, a joint venture between the Methodist Protestant Church and the citizens of High Point, and officially opened on September 14, 1924. When the college opened, the campus consisted of three buildings, attended by nine faculty members, with a student enrollment of 122.

The steadfast growth that characterized the birth of the college ended abruptly with the Great Depression. This period was difficult for the college in 1932–33, as faculty salaries were cut and expenses were sometimes bartered. Despite a $50,000 fund-raising campaign, the college declared bankruptcy on June 15, 1934, and reorganized in an effort to reduce its indebtedness. Subsequent reorganization enabled the college to move forward with business and renewed expansion.

On October 9, 1991, under the guidance of President Jacob C. Martinson, Jr. and the board of trustees, High Point College changed its name to High Point University to reflect post-graduate degree programs. Coinciding with the offering of graduate studies, every building on the campus was renovated and new ones were constructed with a campus quadrangle added to replace a former city street that bisected the campus, and by 2004 the university's endowment increased to $40 million. When Martinson stepped down as president in 2005, he was the longest serving United Methodist college president in the country.

In 2005, the university was 92 acres and landlocked with an undergraduate enrollment of 1,450. Its operating budget was $35 million with approximately 100 faculty members. Since Nido R. Qubein became president of High Point University in 2005 the growth of the university has had significant impact on the city, region and the state of North Carolina. Qubein is the fourth highest paid college president, paid $2.9 million a year, in the United States.

Since Qubein took office in 2005, High Point has grown from three academic schools to 10 academic schools - the David Hayworth College of Arts and Sciences; the Phillips School of Business; the Nido R. Qubein School of Communication; the Stout School of Education; the School of Art and Design; the Wanek School of Natural Sciences; the Fred Wilson School of Pharmacy; the Congdon School of Health Sciences; the Webb School of Engineering; and the School of Dental Medicine and Oral Health. 

In early 2012 Businessweek reported that about $700 million in new building and campus upgrades was financed by heavy borrowing and Moody's Investors Service downgraded the school's bonds to junk status in 2009 due to the school's position as one of the most heavily leveraged colleges in the country. The U.S. Department of Education's "financial responsibility" score for the 2012 and 2013 fiscal year has High Point University scoring the highest possible score of 3, putting the university ahead of Elon University, Duke University, and Davidson College. Businessweek responded by inviting the school to make financial documents available to support any challenges to the article's accuracy, but none were offered in response. In addition to questioning debt levels, Businessweek challenged whether the school's relationships with its lenders and vendors were at an appropriate arm's length, citing in particular that the school spends large amounts on marketing with a public relations firm headed by Qubein's daughter. The college's claims to a growing reputation in higher education were challenged as based more on high-end student amenities and marketing strategy than on academics.

The Chronicle of Higher Education Almanac of April 19, 2016, noted that Qubein was the third highest-donor university president in the country from 2006 to 2016. He committed $10 million to High Point University. Donations from alumni, parents and supporters of HPU total about $214 million since 2006. In 2010, the university announced plans to invest about $2.1 billion in overall growth in the next decade. To date, HPU has spent $1.2 billion on four new schools plus facilities, faculty and student services.

Ashley Furniture Industries Chairman Ron Wanek donated $10 million to HPU in 2013 after visiting Qubein. Wanek's gift to the university is the tenth contribution of $10 million or more that Qubein has received during his tenure.

In April 2016, HPU announced plans to invest $160 million in new building projects including a 5,000-seat arena and conference center, undergraduate science center and residence hall. The Caine Conservatory opened in the spring of 2020 to support botanical research and the growth of HPU’s arboretum and gardens. The facility also includes HPU’s newest eatery, the Butterfly Café. The following year, the $170 million Nido and Mariana Qubein Arena and Conference Center, and the adjoining Jana and Ken Kahn Hotel, opened. It is home to HPU’s men’s and women’s basketball teams, as well as a venue for major events, speakers, concerts, entertainment, academic symposia and recreational activities.

Location 
Together, Greensboro, High Point, and Winston-Salem, along with the surrounding suburbs and townships, form the Piedmont Triad region, an area with a population over 1.5 million. Of that number, approximately 108,285 live in High Point. Both Greensboro and Winston-Salem are 20 minutes from campus. East of the university are Raleigh (1 hours away) and the Atlantic Ocean (3 hours away); south are Charlotte (1 hours away) and Atlanta, Georgia (5 hours away); west are the Appalachian Mountains (2 hours away); and north is Washington, D.C. (5 hours away).

Academics 

High Point University has a student-to-faculty ratio of 17:1. The average freshman retention rate is 81%.

HPU offers 61 undergraduate degree programs (Bachelor of Arts and Bachelor of Science), 65 undergraduate minors, and 14 graduate degree programs (Master of Arts, Master of Education, Master of Public Administration, Master of Business Administration, Master of Science, Master of Physician Assistant Studies, Doctor of Pharmacy, and Doctor of Physical Therapy).

Rankings
HPU has been named to "The Best 387 Colleges: 2022 Edition" by The Princeton Review and on the Best Southeastern Colleges "2022 Best Colleges: Region by Region" list.

Schools 
High Point has ten schools: School of Dental Medicine and Oral Health; Congdon School of Health Sciences; Fred Wilson School of Pharmacy; Webb School of Engineering; Wanek School of Health Sciences; Nido R. Qubein School of Communication; David R. Hayworth School of Arts and Design; Earl N. Phillips School of Business; School of Humanities and Behavioral Sciences; School of Education.

Student life 
High Point University is a residential campus, with 19 residence halls in total. In 2019, The Princeton Review ranked High Point University #5 in the nation for Best College Dorm Rooms. All High Point University students are required to reside on campus until senior year, unless they commute from their parent's permanent address.

Greek life 
There are currently 17 Greek organizations on campus governed by the following councils:

Panhellenic Council (NPC): Alpha Chi Omega, Alpha Gamma Delta, Kappa Delta, Phi Mu, Sigma Sigma Sigma, Zeta Tau Alpha.

National Pan-Hellenic Council (NPHC): Alpha Phi Alpha, Alpha Kappa Alpha, Delta Sigma Theta, Lambda Pi Chi, Kappa Alpha Psi, Zeta Phi Beta

Interfraternity Council (IFC): Pi Kappa Alpha, Beta Theta Pi, Kappa Alpha Order, Delta Chi, Sigma Nu.

Honor societies 
Honor societies at High Point University include the Order of the Lighted Lamp, Alpha Chi (both recognize academic achievement), Alpha Delta Omega (Human Relations), Beta Beta Beta (Biology), Sigma Delta Pi (Spanish), Pi Delta Phi (French), Phi Sigma Iota (Foreign Language), Kappa Kappa Psi (Band), Phi Lambda Sigma (Pharmacy), Lambda Pi Eta (Communications), Alpha Sigma Lambda (Adult Learners), Pi Sigma Alpha (Political Science), Kappa Delta Pi (Education), Delta Mu Delta (Business), Psi Chi (Psychology), Alpha Phi Sigma (Criminal Justice), Sigma Tau Delta (International English Honors Society), Sigma Pi Sigma (Physics), and Alpha Lambda Delta.

In April 2015, 254 students were inducted into High Point University's newest honor society, Alpha Lambda Delta. Alpha Lambda Delta's mission is to encourage superior academic achievement, promote intelligent living and a high standard of learning, and assist students in recognizing and developing meaningful goals in society.

Notable alumni 
 Cody Allen - Former Major League Baseball pitcher. Drafted in the 23rd Round of the 2011 Major League Baseball Draft
 Dick Culler – Former Major League Baseball player
 Julia Dalton - 2015 Miss North Carolina USA
Austin Dillon – NASCAR Sprint Cup Series driver, 2011 NASCAR Camping World Truck Series Champion, 2013 NASCAR Nationwide Series Champion
 Donna Fargo – Grammy-winning country music singer/songwriter
 John Gillespie -   Member of the Tennessee House of Representatives
 Issa Konare – PBL Basketball player for the Vermont Frost Heaves and plays for Senegal's national team
 Gene Littles – Former ABA basketball player and NBA coach
 Jack Lucas – Youngest United States Marine Corps veteran to receive the Medal of Honor
 Robert R. Merhige, Jr. - federal judge for the United States District Court for the Eastern District of Virginia who is known for his ruling on desegregation in the 1970s.
 Jonathan Miller - West Virginia House of Delegates
 Taylor Milne – Canadian Olympian in the 1500 metres and 3000 metre steeplechase
 Nido R. Qubein - Seventh president of High Point University, businessman, motivational speaker, author
 Arizona Reid – Professional basketball player in the Israeli National League 
 Andre Scrubb - Major League Baseball for the Houston Astros
 Jaime Schultz - Baseball player
 Tubby Smith –  College basketball coach and assistant coach of the 2000 U.S. Men's Olympic Basketball Team
 John Taylor, reality television star of Too Fat for 15: Fighting Back

Notable faculty 
 Francisco Laguna Correa - writer, ethnographer, cultural critic, teacher
 Tubby Smith - college basketball coach and assistant coach of the 2000 U.S. Men's Olympic Basketball Team

Athletics 

The High Point Panthers include HPU's 16 athletic teams that compete at the NCAA Division I level, mostly in the Big South Conference. HPU's 16 varsity sports are baseball, men's and women's basketball, men's and women's cross country, men's and women's golf, men's and women's lacrosse, men's and women's soccer, men's and women's indoor track & field, men's and women's outdoor track & field and women's volleyball. In recent years, HPU has won nine Big South Conference Championships, produced 10 Conference Players of the Year; and more than 130 HPU athletes have received Big South All-Academic Honors.

The 2010–11 season was the most successful since High Point University joined NCAA Division I in 1999–2000. In the fall, the women's soccer team and women's volleyball team won Big South Tournaments and the men's soccer team won the Big South regular season. In the spring, the women's lacrosse team won the National Lacrosse Conference tournament and set a record for wins by a first-year program, with 15.

The 2010-2011 women's lacrosse team success led to other accomplishments in 2013. Women's lacrosse assistant coach Lauren Norris was selected to coach the 2013 Israel National Lacrosse Team in the 2013 FIL Women's World Cup.

In the fourth round of the 2013 Major League Soccer (MLS) Supplemental Draft, the Columbus Crew picked High Point University senior midfielder Shawn Sloan.

In 2016, Christine Rickert of the High Point University women's track and field team qualified to compete in the U.S. Olympic Team Trials in Eugene, Oregon. Rickert placed 12th in the javelin throw, just nine places away from a spot on the Olympic Team. She remains the Big South Conference Record Holder in javelin with a throw of 52.47m (172–2 ft).

High Point University also fields the following sports at the club level: men's and women's basketball, men's and women's golf, men's and women's lacrosse, men's and women's rowing, running, men's and women's soccer, men's and women's swimming, men's and women's tennis, women's field hockey, softball, ultimate frisbee, equestrian and ice hockey.

In the fall of 2013, the High Point University field hockey team qualified for the national tournament in Virginia Beach with a 6-2-0 season. The club equestrian team is a member of the Intercollegiate Horse Show Association (IHSA).

Donations to High Point University's Athletic Department have exceeded $30 million. The primary athletics facilities at High Point University are the Qubein Center (basketball), Millis Center (volleyball), Williard Stadium (baseball), and the Witcher Athletic Center at Vert Stadium (track, soccer, lacrosse).

At the beginning of 2017, High Point University announced plans for a new basketball arena and conference center to be built on campus. The facility will be named for High Point University president, Dr. Nido R. Qubein, and his wife, Mariana Qubein. Construction on the Nido and Mariana Qubein Arena and Conference Center began in 2018; the facility was originally projected to open in 2020, but construction was delayed due to COVID-19 issues. The facility opened in late September 2021, with the first basketball game to be played on November 4. The Qubein Center includes 4,500 arena seats, 2,500 conference center seats. It was also announced in early 2017 that the basketball court in the new arena was named after High Point men's head coach and High Point University alumnus Tubby Smith. Smith and his wife, Donna, donated $1 million to the construction of the new facility.

In spring 2018, HPU announced the hire of hiring of Hall of Famer and NCAA Championship Winning coach Orlando 'Tubby' Smith as the Panthers' head coach for men's basketball. Smith, who becomes the 12th head men's basketball coach in HPU history, joins the Panthers after serving as the head coach at Memphis for two seasons.

Dan Hauser has served as the HPU athletic director since 2014.

Publications and media 
 High Point University Magazine, for alumni
 The Apogee, the literary magazine
 Black Script
 Hi-Po, a monthly publication by students for fellow students
 Zenith, yearbook
 HPU Vision, on-campus broadcast club
 HPU Sports Link, broadcasts HPU athletics live online

Sechrest Gallery 
A permanent collection of original works donated to the university by High Point Alumnus Darrell L. Sechrest. Among others, the permanent collection includes works by Christian Dietrich, Sir Lawrence Alma-Tadema, Sir Joshua Reynolds, Allesandro Gherardini, El Greco, George Harvey, Emile Louis Picault, Elsie Popkin, and Antonio Zucchi and Angelica Kauffman. The gallery is housed within the Hayworth Fine Arts Center.

References

External links 
 

 
Educational institutions established in 1924
High Point, North Carolina
Universities and colleges accredited by the Southern Association of Colleges and Schools
Universities and colleges in Guilford County, North Carolina
Private universities and colleges in North Carolina
1924 establishments in North Carolina